Hedong Township is a township of Guide County, in the east of Hainan Tibetan Autonomous Prefecture in eastern Qinghai province, China, located adjacent to and east of the county seat. , it has one residential community and 15 villages under its administration. In the 2020 National Census it has a population of 12,868.

References 

Township-level divisions of Qinghai
Guide County